Sound the Alarm may refer to:

Sound the Alarm (band), an American rock band, or a 2005 album by the band
Sound the Alarm (Booker T. Jones album), or the title song, 2013
Sound the Alarm (The Dawn album), or the title song, 2009
Sound the Alarm (Howie Day album), or the title song, 2009
Sound the Alarm (Saves the Day album), or the title song, 2006
Sound the Alarm (EP), by Less Than Jake, 2017
"Sound the Alarm", a song by A Day to Remember from And Their Name Was Treason, 2005
"Sound the Alarm", a song by Thievery Corporation from Radio Retaliation, 2008

See also
Sound an Alarm, a 1962 British documentary film